Dracotettix is a genus of dragon lubbers in the family Romaleidae. There are at least three described species in Dracotettix.

Species
These three species belong to the genus Dracotettix:
 Dracotettix monstrosus Bruner, 1889 (gray dragon lubber)
 Dracotettix newboldi Hebard, 1931
 Dracotettix plutonius Bruner, 1893

References

Further reading

 

Romaleidae
Articles created by Qbugbot